Ferdinand Francis Fernandez (born May 29, 1937) is a Senior United States circuit judge of the United States Court of Appeals for the Ninth Circuit and a former United States District Judge of the United States District Court for the Central District of California.

Education and career

Born in Pasadena, California, Fernandez received a Bachelor of Science degree from the University of Southern California in 1958, a Juris Doctor from the University of Southern California Gould School of Law in 1962, and  a Master of Laws from Harvard Law School in 1963. He was a law clerk for Judge William M. Byrne of the United States District Court for the Central District of California from 1963 to 1964, thereafter entering private practice in Pomona, California until 1980. He was a judge of the San Bernardino County State Superior Court of California from 1980 to 1985.

Federal judicial service

On July 19, 1985, Fernandez was nominated by President Ronald Reagan to a new seat on the United States District Court for the Central District of California created by 98 Stat. 333. He was confirmed by the United States Senate on October 16, 1985, and received his commission on October 17, 1985. His service terminated on May 24, 1989, due to elevation to the Ninth Circuit.

Fernandez was nominated by President George H. W. Bush on February 28, 1989, for elevation to a seat on the United States Court of Appeals for the Ninth Circuit vacated by Judge Warren John Ferguson. Fernandez was confirmed by the United States Senate on May 18, 1989, and received his commission on May 22, 1989. He assumed senior status on June 1, 2002.

Notable cases
On February 28, 2020, Fernandez dissented when the 9th circuit ruled 2-1 that Trump's administration could not force asylum applicants to wait in Mexico while their court proceedings went on. On March 11, 2020, the Supreme Court agreed with Fernandez and permitted Trump's "Remain-in-Mexico" policy to continue.

On April 7, 2020, Fernandez dissented when the 9th circuit ruled 2–1, in an opinion by Milan Smith, that immigrants that have been detained for 6 months or more must be given bond hearings. Fernandez argued that the mode of analysis the majority used was plainly wrong.

See also 
 List of Hispanic/Latino American jurists

References

Sources

1937 births
20th-century American judges
California state court judges
Harvard Law School alumni
Hispanic and Latino American judges
Judges of the United States Court of Appeals for the Ninth Circuit
Judges of the United States District Court for the Central District of California
Living people
People from Pasadena, California
Superior court judges in the United States
United States court of appeals judges appointed by George H. W. Bush
United States district court judges appointed by Ronald Reagan
USC Gould School of Law alumni